Relator , female relatrix , (Latin for "narrator") is the legal term meaning a private person at whose relation or on whose behalf an application for a quo warranto or mandamus is filed. The relator appears as one beneficially interested, but the action is maintained on his behalf. The relator furnishes the knowledge or facts on which an information or a proceeding in quo warranto is based. Such a proceeding is usually in the name of the state, ex rel. (ex relatione = "[arising] out of the narration") of the relator, and so is called an "ex rel. action".

Qui tam
A qui tam action may be brought by any party (as a relator) against an entity that is fraudulently collecting money from the United States government by filing false claims. The party bringing the suit – the relator – must have possession of information substantiating the claim of fraud against the government. The government shares a percentage of the monies collected, along with a share of treble damages and penalties if any, with the relator. The relator may be any entity including a private individual, trade association, or labor union. Congress authorized qui tam actions in the False Claims Act.

References

Common law legal terminology
Civil procedure
Civil procedure legal terminology
American legal terminology